Omnibus is an oil on canvas painting by the Swedish artist Anders Zorn from 1891 to 1892. There are two versions of the painting, the first one is exhibited at Nationalmuseum in Stockholm and the second in Isabella Stewart Gardner Museum in Boston.

Omnibus is an Impressionism painting representing contemporary urban life in Paris. It depicts 4-5 people sitting in public trolley. In the foreground there is a young woman with a square box. Behind her, a prostitute can be seen. Both women represent the modern life with its commercial attractions and dangers.

References

Paintings by Anders Zorn
1892 paintings
Genre paintings
Paintings in the collection of the Nationalmuseum Stockholm
Paintings in the collection of the Isabella Stewart Gardner Museum